Simon Watson may refer to:

 Simon Watson (ice hockey) (born 1980), Canadian ice hockey player
 Simon Watson (photographer), Irish photographer
 Simon Watson (rower) (born 1987), New Zealand rower